Peter A. Lyford is an American politician. He is a Republican representing District 129 in the Maine House of Representatives.

Political career 

In 2014, Lyford ran for election to represent District 129 in the Maine House of Representatives, and defeated Democrat Teresa Montague to win. He has been re-elected three times.

Electoral record

References 

Living people
Republican Party members of the Maine House of Representatives
21st-century American politicians
People from Brewer, Maine
Husson University alumni
Year of birth missing (living people)